Walter Edward Whitehead (20 May 1908 – 16 April 1978), also known as Commander Whitehead, was an iconic advertisement representative of Schweppes Tonic Water, playing himself as a suave and cosmopolitan man of taste and distinction in a widely-distributed advertising campaign of the 1950s and 1960s. He was also a successful executive, being head of Schweppes' American operations.

Life and career
Whitehead was born on 20 May 1908 in Aldershot, England. He served with the Royal Navy in World War II, attaining the rank of Commander.

In 1947, Whitehead was an economic advisor to Sir Stafford Cripps (then Chancellor of the Exchequer), working on training and productivity in British industry. He joined Schweppes in 1950, being responsible for foreign expansion. In 1953, he was made president of Schweppe's American operations, in the same year catching the eye of adman David Ogilvy, who was creating advertising for Schweppes. Schweppes had until 1952 been imported from Britain, and was thus an expensive niche product. In 1952 an agreement was signed with Pepsi to bottle Schweppes in America, allowing the price to be cut in half. Ogilvy's remit was to convince Americans that the lowering of price was not accompanied by a lowering of quality. Ogilvy had just recently created the "Hathaway Man" character for C.F. Hathaway Company, featuring Baron George Wrangell as a sophisticated and talented figure with a mysterious eyepatch and convinced Whitehead (who was at first reluctant) to become an icon with similar snob appeal for Schweppes.

Based on Whitehead's mature good looks and world-class beard, the "Commander Whitehead" character radiated a cultured sophistication and projected a comfortable and understated aura of confident savoir-faire and elegant taste coupled with worldly accomplishment and the aura of old money. The campaign was in heavy rotation for almost 20 years, from the mid 1950s through the 1960s. The term "schweppervescence" (a portmanteau of "Schweppes" and "effervescence") was used in the campaign. (Whitehead actually was a well-rounded and accomplished man, combining his military, executive, and public service achievements with pursuits such as fox hunting, sailing, skiing, and culinary expertise.) 

Whithead eventually became a director of Cadbury Schweppes Ltd., Schweppes's British parent company. He also served as chairman of the British Export Marketing Advisory Committee, as a trustee of the International Marketing Institute at Harvard, and on the board  of General Cigar Company and Cunard Lines. 

In 1961 Queen Elizabeth awarded Whitehead the rank of CBE (Commander of the Most Excellent Order of the British Empire) for his achievements in exporting British products.

Whitehead was married to Adinah Whitehead; they had two children. He died on 16 April 1978, in Petersfield.

Works

See also
The Most Interesting Man in the World, a later and somewhat similar advertising character

References

Notes

1908 births
1978 deaths
Royal Navy officers of World War II
British advertising executives
Businesspeople from Aldershot
20th-century English businesspeople